A Witch's Love is a 2014 South Korean television series starring Uhm Jung-hwa and Park Seo-joon. It aired on cable channel tvN from April 14 to June 10, 2014 on Mondays and Tuesdays at 21:40 (KST) time slot for 16 episodes.

The romantic comedy series is a remake of the hit 2009 Taiwanese drama My Queen.

Synopsis
Sparks fly when Ji-yeon and Dong-ha meet, and despite the age difference, they find a lot in common with each other, including their scarred hearts.

Cast

Main
 Uhm Jung-hwa as Ban Ji-yeon
A 39-year-old investigative news reporter at Trouble Maker. Her job is the most important thing in Ji-yeon's life, and she's so passionate about it that colleagues call her a "witch" behind her back. Ji-yeon focuses all her energy on work because she stopped believing in love after her last boyfriend, 41-year-old war photographer Noh Shi-hoon (Han Jae-suk) disappeared prior to their wedding day.

 Park Seo-joon as Yoon Dong-ha
A 25-year-old guy who runs a small errand center with his friend. Their store will do pretty much anything for a customer from dressing as Santa Claus to providing security for an idol star. Dong-ha seems happy-go-lucky, but he hides a secret sorrow, having lost his girlfriend to a fatal heart problem. Since her death, he's lost all his ambition and drive, with his career plans sidelined.

Supporting
 Yang Hee-kyung as Choi Jung-sook, Ji-yeon's mother
 Ra Mi-ran as Baek Na-rae, Ji-yeon's friend
 Lee Se-chang as Kang Min-gu, Na-rae's husband
 Yoon Hyun-min as Yong Soo-cheol, Dong-ha's friend 
 Han Jae-suk as Noh Shi-hoon, photographer
 Sa Hee as Hong Chae-hee, Shi-hoon's assistant
 Bang Eun-hee as Oh Mi-yeon, Eun-chae's mother
 Joo Jin-mo as Kwon Hyun-seob, publisher and Ji-yeon's boss
 Kang Sung-jin as Byun Seok-ki
 Yoon Joon-sung as Song Young-shik
 Shin Soo-hang as Nam Chang-min
 Lee Seul-bi as Oh Rin-ji
 Heo Do-young as Jae-woong
 Jung Yeon-joo as Jung Eun-chae
 Moo Jin-sung as Jin Woo

Special appearances
 Jeon No-min as Kim Jeong-do (ep. 1-2)
 Lee Eung-kyung as Baek Soo-jeong (ep. 1-2)
 Sung Ji-ru as security guard (ep. 1-2)
 Narsha as mudang (ep. 1-2)
 Ryu Dam as MC (ep. 1-2)
 Choi Jung-hwa as curator 
 Lee Jae-yoon as Ji-yeon's blind date (ep. 4)
 Noh Soo-ram as Hyun-ji
 Kim Yul-ho as Dong-ha's senior colleague
 Yeo Ui-joo as Jin-woo, Eun-chae's friend
 Jin Ye-sol as Jung Young-chae
 Lee Guk-joo as misunderstanding woman 
 Kim Yeo-woon as that woman's boyfriend
 Jo Sun-mook as Yoon Se-joon
 Lee Jin-ho
 Kwon Young-min
 Han Yeon-soo
 Park Young-soo
 Yoon In-jo
 Lee Moo-saeng as Detective Lee (Ep.10 & 13)

Original soundtrack

Awards and nominations

References

External links
  
 
 

2014 South Korean television series debuts
TVN (South Korean TV channel) television dramas
Korean-language television shows
2014 South Korean television series endings
South Korean romantic comedy television series
South Korean television series based on non-South Korean television series